Katja Nass (born 26 November 1968) is a German former fencer. She competed in the women's individual and team épée events at the 1996 and 2000 Summer Olympics.

References

External links
 

1968 births
Living people
German female fencers
Olympic fencers of Germany
Fencers at the 1996 Summer Olympics
Fencers at the 2000 Summer Olympics
Universiade medalists in fencing
People from Moers
Sportspeople from Düsseldorf (region)
Universiade silver medalists for Germany
Medalists at the 1995 Summer Universiade
20th-century German women